Pender Murphy (born March 19, 1959) is a former professional tennis player from United States.

Murphy grew up in Charlotte, North Carolina and attended Clemson University, where he earned All-American honors on three occasions.

Following his time at Clemson University he competed professionally for two years. His best result on the Grand Prix tour was a semi-final appearance at Venice in 1982, after which he reached a career best ranking of 102 in the world. He competed in the main draw of two Grand Slam tournaments, the 1982 US Open and 1983 French Open.

References

External links
 
 

1959 births
Living people
American male tennis players
Tennis people from North Carolina
Sportspeople from Charlotte, North Carolina
Clemson Tigers men's tennis players